The 2000 Team Ice Racing World Championship was the 22nd edition of the Team World Championship. The final was held on 26/27 February, 2000, in Berlin, in Germany. Russia won the title.

Final Classification

See also 
 2000 Individual Ice Speedway World Championship
 2000 Speedway World Team Cup in classic speedway
 2000 Speedway Grand Prix in classic speedway

References 

Ice speedway competitions
World